Elizabeth "Nanna" Abrahams (19 September 1925 – 17 December 2008) was a South African political activist and trade unionist who participated actively in the struggle against apartheid. Born in the Paarl Valley area of Western Cape Province, South Africa, Liz, as she was affectionately called, became General Secretary of the Food and Canning Workers Union (FCWU) in 1956, a duty she performed until 1964. Her commitment to the struggle brought her close to activists including Elizabeth Mafikeng, Archie Sibeko, Oscar Mpetha and Ray Alexander. She was in 1986 detained for police questioning and subsequently detained for almost three months without trial. After her retirement, Abrahams remained actively involved in the Food and Allied Workers Union (FAWU), and was in 1995, a year after South Africa's first democratic elections, invited to serve as a Member of Parliament. During the last years of her life, Abrahams received several awards for her contributions to the liberation movement and for her activities on behalf of the rights of the working class.

Early life
Elizabeth "Nanna" Abrahams was born into a working-class coloured family in the Paarl Valley. She showed enthusiasm for politics from an early age, an interest she later attributed to her father's own interest in reading and discussing political issues. The economic climate in Paarl during Abrahams's childhood severely limited job opportunities, and after the death of her father she dropped out of school to work as a seasonal labourer on a local fruit canning factory. There she became aware of the harsh conditions workers faced, including long working hours and low wages.

Political activity
The frequent periods of unemployment associated with life as a seasonal labourer contributed to Abrahams's increasing awareness of the poor conditions endured by the workers, and especially by women. A Food and Canning Workers Union (FCWU) was established in 1941; Abrahams was persuaded to join by Ray Alexander, who was then an active Communist and trade unionist. Though women members were granted only a limited role in the union's early days, Abrahams – among other female members – began to take on an important organizational and uniting role. Abrahams promoted the cause of non-racialism among union members, an issue of increasing controversy after a 1947 apartheid law banned racially mixed unions, threatening the FCWU's stability and unity.

Abrahams was in 1956 elected General Secretary of FCWU, a position she held until 1964. Her leadership was characterised by a strong commitment to the union and an unwavering support for the anti-apartheid movement, which eventually led her to join the African National Congress (ANC). Her political activities earned Abrahams a five-year ban from the union in August 1964, and she spent the ban period under house arrest. Despite her banishment, Abrahams continued working for the union and assisting comrades such as Elizabeth Mafekeng and Archie Sibeko, both of whom faced exile. Years later, on 13 June 1986, Abrahams was detained and kept under custody without trial for a period of three months.

Marriage and family

The life of a political activist is never easy. Often, activists encounter opposition from family and friends alike. Liz did not find much support from her family and husband, mostly because they lacked the understanding and insight into her political activities. Although she never had children, Liz "Nanna" was a very warm and affectionate person who treated her nephews, nieces and the children from the community as her own. Despite the lack of support at home, she remained dedicated to her duties as a union leader.

Retirement
Liz continued helping the Food and Allied Workers Union (FAWU) with the organisation of farm workers in the Nooder Paarl and Pniel branches. In 1990 she was elected the interim chairman of the Paarl ANC branch. Other leadership positions followed as she was vice-chairlady of the ANC's Women's League and a member of the Communist Party. Five years later she became a member of the first democratically elected South African Parliament. "Nanna" Liz Abrahams died peacefully on 17 December 2008 aged 83, surrounded by family and friends.

References

1925 births
2008 deaths
People from the Cape Winelands District Municipality
Cape Coloureds
South African Communist Party politicians
African National Congress politicians